Nohoval Drinks Company Ltd., trading as Stonewell Cider, is a craft brewery founded in either 2009 or 2010 in Nohoval, Ireland by husband and wife Daniel and Géraldine Emerson. Stonewell also trades internationally as Finbarra Cider. Daniel Emerson is the chief cider maker. In Ireland, Stonewell is distributed by Classic Drinks. Though their share of the Irish cider market is small (0.5%), Ireland is the biggest cider-consuming nation per capita, and Stonewell is the largest artisan drinks maker in the country. Stonewell distributes to many countries within Europe, as well as to Canada and Australia.

History 
Inspired by Géraldine's father, a wine-maker from the Orleanais province in France, the couple decided to pursue full time traditional cider-making in 2010. In their first year, Stonewell produced 6,000 litres of cider. By 2011, Emerson had tripled production, and tripled it again in 2012. In 2012, Daniel Emerson announced a deal to distribute in Italy via Qualitá Club.

In 2015, Stonewell pressed over 750 tonnes of apples, resulting in the production of 350,000 litres of cider.  In 2016, Stonewell secured a five-year distribution contract in France through Carlsberg. The total volume ordered equates in the deal's first three years to Stonewell's entire 2015 production.

For many years, Stonewell experienced triple-digit growth. However, in 2020, due to lockdowns caused by the Coronavirus pandemic, Stonewell sales dropped by 80%, and as a result, half of its staff were made redundant. The company employs five staff members full-time.

Awards 
Stonewell has won over 20 awards since its foundation., including Supreme Champion of the 2016 Blas na hÉireann awards.

References

External links 
 Stonewell Cider Official Website

Irish companies established in 2010
Irish ciders